The 1979–80 Colorado Rockies season was the franchise's fourth season in Colorado and their sixth in the NHL. Trying to jolt the fan base and create some excitement for the club, the team hired Don Cherry, who had been fired by the Boston Bruins, and installed him as the new head coach. In addition, a major mid-season trade netted the Rockies legendary goal-scorer and future Hall-of-Famer Lanny McDonald from the Toronto Maple Leafs.

With the first pick overall in the draft, the Rockies selected offensive-minded defenseman Rob Ramage. It was the first time that the Rockies had the first pick overall.

Offseason

NHL Draft

Regular season

Season standings

Schedule and results

Transactions
On December 29, 1979, the Maple Leafs traded Lanny McDonald and Joel Quenneville to the Colorado Rockies for Wilf Paiement and Pat Hickey.

Player statistics

Regular season
Scoring

Goaltending

Note: GP = Games played; G = Goals; A = Assists; Pts = Points; +/- = Plus/minus; PIM = Penalty minutes; PPG=Power-play goals; SHG=Short-handed goals; GWG=Game-winning goals
      MIN=Minutes played; W = Wins; L = Losses; T = Ties; GA = Goals against; GAA = Goals against average; SO = Shutouts;

Awards and records

Transactions

Farm teams
Affiliations have included: Flint Generals, Fort Worth Texans

References

External links
 Rockies on Hockey Database

Colorado Rockies (NHL) seasons
Colorado
Colorado
Colorado Rockies
Colorado Rockies